Ricard Pueyo Ministral  (born 1 March 1967) is a Spanish racewalker. He competed in the men's 20 kilometres walk at the 1988 Summer Olympics.

References

1967 births
Living people
Athletes (track and field) at the 1988 Summer Olympics
Spanish male racewalkers
Olympic athletes of Spain